Svojšice is a municipality and village in Pardubice District in the Pardubice Region of the Czech Republic. It has about 300 inhabitants.

Culture
Until 2007, Svojšice hosted the Antifest punk rock festival.

References

External links

Villages in Pardubice District